Jorma Vilho Paavali Kinnunen (15 December 1941 – 25 July 2019) was an athlete from Finland who competed mainly in the javelin throw. He was born in Pihtipudas.

He competed for Finland in the 1968 Summer Olympics held in Mexico City, Mexico in the javelin throw where he won the silver medal.

On 18 June 1969 Kinnunen threw a world record 92,70m in javelin at Tampere stadium, Finland.

Kinnunen was the  father of Kimmo Kinnunen, a world champion javelin thrower. He also had a daughter, Sanna Kinnunen, and another son, Jarkko Kinnunen, who died on 23 February 2019.

Kinnunen died after a long illness on 25 July 2019, aged 77.

References

External links
 

1941 births
2019 deaths
People from Pihtipudas
Finnish male javelin throwers
Olympic silver medalists for Finland
Athletes (track and field) at the 1964 Summer Olympics
Athletes (track and field) at the 1968 Summer Olympics
Athletes (track and field) at the 1972 Summer Olympics
Olympic athletes of Finland
Medalists at the 1968 Summer Olympics
Olympic silver medalists in athletics (track and field)
Sportspeople from Central Finland
20th-century Finnish people
21st-century Finnish people